Governor Hurley may refer to:

Charles F. Hurley (1893–1946), 54th Governor of Massachusetts
Robert A. Hurley (1895–1968), 73rd Governor of Connecticut